The 1888 Connecticut gubernatorial election was held on November 6, 1888. Republican nominee Morgan Bulkeley defeated Democratic nominee Luzon B. Morris with 47.94% of the vote.

This was the third (and last) consecutive gubernatorial election in which the Republican-controlled state legislature elected the candidate who received fewer votes. It was also the last such election to be determined by the state legislature. The law at the time specified that if no candidate received a majority, the state legislature would decide the election. Coincidentally, this election ran concurrent with the US Presidential election, in which Republican nominee Benjamin Harrison was elected president by the Electoral College, despite receiving fewer votes than incumbent Democrat Grover Cleveland.

General election

Candidates
Major party candidates
Morgan Bulkeley, Republican
Luzon B. Morris, Democratic

Other candidates
Hiram Camp, Prohibition
F. A. Andrews, Labor

Results

References

1888
Connecticut
Gubernatorial